Lardeh may refer to:
 Lardeh, Bushehr
 Lardeh, Rudsar, Gilan Province
 Lardeh, Siahkal, Gilan Province